The women's singles Squash event was part of the squash programme and took place between December 9 and December 12, at the Ambassador City Jomtien Hotel, Pattaya, Thailand.

Schedule
All times are Indochina Time (UTC+07:00)

Results

Final

Top half

Bottom half

References 

Results
Results

Women's singles